Dysgedydd y Plant was a Welsh language periodical produced for use by Congregationalist Church Sunday schools. It was first published in Dolgellau by W Hughes in 1871. The articles it contained covered religious and general educational subjects, including biographies. Its editors included David Griffith (1823–1913) and Richard Roberts (1871–1935).
 At a time when state schools punished children for speaking Welsh, children's publications such as this were important in preserving the skills of reading and writing in the Welsh language.

References 

Periodicals published in Wales
Welsh-language magazines
Music magazines published in the United Kingdom